Błonie  is a town in Warsaw West County, Masovian Voivodeship, Poland, with a population of 12,058 as of December 2021.

History
The settlement dates back to the 8th century. It was first mentioned in the 11th century, and already in the 12th century constituted a sizeable settlement with the first church founded in 1257 by Duke Konrad II of Masovia. The church built in the Early Gothic style exists to this day, although rebuilt several times. The town rights were granted to Błonie by Duke Władysław of Kraków on 2 May 1338. Błonie was a royal town of Poland and a county seat in the Masovian Voivodeship in the Greater Poland Province of the Polish Crown. In the 16th century Błonie was a prosperous town, especially known for shoemaking and brewing. Five annual fairs were held in the town. The town was granted new royal privileges in 1580 and 1688. One of two main routes connecting Warsaw and Dresden ran through the town in the 18th century and Kings Augustus II the Strong and Augustus III of Poland often traveled that route. In 1794, during the Kościuszko Uprising, Poles led by Stanisław Mokronowski won the Battle of Błonie against Prussia.

World War II

During the Nazi German invasion of Poland at the onset of World War II, the unit of Leibstandarte SS Adolf Hitler murdered 50 civilians (mostly Jews) on the outskirts of Błonie in a single mass execution, on (pl) of 18 September 1939. In 1939, the Germans established a transit camp for Polish prisoners of war in the town, and later also a forced labour camp. The Polish resistance movement was active in the town's vicinity.

German authorities established a Jewish ghetto in Błonie in December 1940, in order to confine the Jewish population of the town for the purpose of persecution, terror, and exploitation. By the time Poland was liberated from German occupation, not a single Jewish ghetto remained.

Transport
Błonie railway station, opened in 1902 on the Warsaw–Kalisz Railway, is served by Koleje Mazowieckie, who run services between Kutno and Warszawa Wschodnia.

Sports
It competes in the lower leagues.

International relations

Twin towns - sister cities
Błonie is twinned with:
  Coreno Ausonio, Italy

References

External links

 Official website 
 Jewish Community of Błonie on Virtual Shtetl

Cities and towns in Masovian Voivodeship
Masovian Voivodeship (1526–1795)
Warsaw Voivodeship (1919–1939)
Warsaw West County
Holocaust locations in Poland
Nazi war crimes in Poland
Populated places established in the 8th century